Living memory may refer to:

Living Memory (paintings), a series of paintings by Nabil Kanso
a software application, see BRICKS (software)#Living Memory